Winter-Telling Stories is a collection of Kiowa tales written by Alice Marriott and illustrated by Roland Whitehorse.

Background
Marriott relates a number of stories told her by George Hunt. The stories all relate to Saynday, the main character in the book, and his involvement with natural events on the southern plains. The title comes from Hunt's admonition to "always tell my stories in the winter, when the outdoors work is finished."

Editions
New York: Thomas Y. Crowell Company, 1947.
New York: W. Sloane Associates, 1947.
New York: Thomas Y. Crowell Company, 1969.

References

Kiowa
Traditional narratives of indigenous peoples of the Americas
Mythologies of the indigenous peoples of North America
Culture of the Western United States
Oklahoma culture